The  was the first Japanese second-generation DC electric locomotive type with six driven axles (classes EF60 to EF67), and the first versions used the same MT49 390 kW traction motors as the ED60 and ED61 designs. A total of 143 locomotives were built between 1960 and 1964 by Kawasaki, Tōshiba, Tōyō & Kisha Seizō, and Mitsubishi. The class was split between 129 freight locomotives (classified EF60-0) designed to supersede the mammoth EH10s on Tōkaidō and Sanyō Main Line freight, and 14 passenger locomotives (EF60-500) to replace EF58s on sleeping car trains on the Tōkaidō and Sanyō Mainlines.

The third-batch build of locos (EF60 84 to 129 and EF60 512 to 514) had up-rated traction motors and differed slightly in having twin headlamps (like the EF65 and other later types) rather than the single large headlamp on earlier versions. Unlike the ED60s, these locos were designed to operate singly rather than in pairs, and so cab-end gangway doors were not included. The EF60-0s initially appeared in the standard all-over brown livery, but were repainted into blue from 1965 onward.

The role of the EF60-500s at the head of the premier Blue Trains was short-lived, however, with the arrival of more powerful EF65s in 1965, and they too found themselves transferred to freight duties. From the late 1970s, EF60s were to be seen on the Chūō, Takasaki, and Ryōmō Lines in the Kantō region, and some locos were transferred to the Hanwa Line and Kisei Mainline in the Kansai region from the mid-1980s.

Withdrawals commenced in the 1980s, and all members of the class were withdrawn from regular operations in 1986, ahead of privatization. Two locos survived into JR days: EF60 19 owned by JR East for special event use, and EF60 503 by JR West.
Eight early-built locos were converted to EF61-200s between 1977 and 1979 for use as bankers on the steeply-graded "Senohachi" section of the Sanyō Mainline between Seno and Hachihonmatsu. Three more later-built EF60s were more extensively rebuilt in 1982 to become EF67 class banking locos (numbers EF67 1 to 3) for use on the same section.

Build details

Banker conversions

EF61-200 conversions
Eight Class EF60 locomotives were converted between 1977 and 1979 to become Class EF61-200 banking locomotives for use on the "Senohachi" section of the Sanyo Main Line.

EF67 conversions
Three Class EF60 locomotives were converted between 1982 and 1986 to become Class EF67 banking locomotives for use on the "Senohachi" section of the Sanyo Main Line.

Preserved examples
 EF60 19 Preserved at JR East's Takasaki Depot in operating condition (occasional mainline use), repainted in 2007 into standard blue/cream livery (previously special white livery with blue/red stripes)
 EF60 47 No. 2 cab section only, on display inside JR East's Ōmiya Works, brown livery
 EF60 123 Plinthed in front of Ashikaga Station (JR Ryōmō Line), standard blue livery
 EF60 501 Usui Pass Railway Heritage Park, Gunma, in tokkyū blue livery
 EF60 503 Formerly preserved at JR West's Miyahara Depot (cut up November 2008)
 EF60 510 Preserved at JR East's Ōmiya Works in tokkyū blue livery

See also
 Japan Railways locomotive numbering and classification

References

 

Electric locomotives of Japan
Bo-Bo-Bo locomotives
1500 V DC locomotives
Preserved electric locomotives
Railway locomotives introduced in 1960
Toshiba locomotives
1067 mm gauge locomotives of Japan